Matthew Geoghegan was a Republic of Ireland international footballer.

Geoghegan was capped twice for the Republic of Ireland at senior level, scoring in both games. He made his debut in a 5–2 friendly victory over Germany on 17 October 1936.

References

External links
 Profile from soccerscene.ie

Republic of Ireland association footballers
Republic of Ireland international footballers
St James's Gate F.C. players
Association footballers not categorized by position
1906 births
Year of death missing